Gulbar Khan is a Pakistani politician who is member-elect of the Gilgit Baltistan Assembly. He used to be a member of JUI(F) but later on joined Pakistan Tehreek-e-Insaf.

Political career
Khan contested 2020 Gilgit-Baltistan Assembly election on 15 November 2020 from constituency GBA-18 (Diamer-IV) on the ticket of Pakistan Tehreek-e-Insaf. He won the election by the margin of 807 votes over the runner up Independent  Malik Kifayatur Rehman. He garnered 6,793 votes while Rehman received 5,986 votes.

References

Living people
Gilgit-Baltistan MLAs 2020–2025
Politicians from Gilgit-Baltistan
Year of birth missing (living people)